Helen Forde  is an archivist and academic.

Career
Forde taught postgraduate courses on archives at University College London and worked as an archivist in local government and at The National Archive.

Forde was elected as a Fellow of the Society of Antiquaries of London on 14 June 2001. 

Forde has served on various administrative and charitable boards. She is a trustee of the British Postal Museum & Archive and served as its Chairperson from 2011 to 2015, is a board member of the Banbury Museum, and has served on the board of the Museums, Libraries and Archives Council.

On 1 July 2019 Forde was re-elected for a further two years as a committee member to the Advisory Committee on National Records and Archives.

Select publications
Forde, H. 1997. "Preservation policies - who needs them?", Journal of the Society of Archivists 18/2, 165-173.
Forde, H. 1998. "Preservation and conservation of documents; problems and solutions", Janus, 32-48.
forde, H. 2002. "Archival training in the United Kingdom - new directions?", In W Stepniak (ed). Archives in the Information Society; papers of the international conference at Popowo. Warsaw, Naczelna Dyrekcja Archiwow Panstwowych. 133-140.
Forde, H. 2005. "Access and preservation in the 21st century". Journal of the Society of Archivists 2005/2
Forde, H. 2006. "Access and the social contract in publicly funded institutions". In Gorman, GE and SHep, SJ (eds) Preservation Management for Libraries, Museums and Archives 
Forde, H. 2007. Preserving Archives.

References

Living people
Female archivists
British archivists
Year of birth missing (living people)
Fellows of the Society of Antiquaries of London
Academics of University College London